Northumberland and Durham Family History Society is a family history society that covers Northumberland, Durham, and Tyne and Wear in the North-East of England.

It was created in 1975, and its aims are to "promote interest in family history amongst its members and the general public.

It produces a quarterly Journal, and has a wide range of publications, parish records in particular, for sale.

It is a member of the Federation of Family History Societies.

External links
Northumberland and Durham Family History Society

Family history societies in the United Kingdom
Organisations based in Tyne and Wear
1975 establishments in England